Amanda Waller is a fictional character in the DC Extended Universe (DCEU) and later the DC Universe (DCU) media franchise.  She is portrayed by Viola Davis and is based on the DC Comics character of the same name.  She is a morally ambiguous character as in the comics, Waller is a ruthless, calculating government official who oversees the operations of the Suicide Squad, tasking them with deadly missions. 

As of 2023, the character is a major recurring figure in the DCEU, appearing in the films Suicide Squad (2016), its sequel The Suicide Squad (2021), and Black Adam (2022) with an uncredited cameo, as well as the first season of the television series Peacemaker (2022-present). 

The character is set to be integrated into the rebooted continuity of the succeeding DC Universe (DCU) media franchise, and will return in both the animated series Creature Commandos, and the live-action series Waller.

Character development and execution

Comics origins and prior portrayals
In the comics, Amanda Waller first appeared in the 1980s as a Congressional aide who is placed in charge of the Suicide Squad, with her role and characteristics varying with publication changes such as The New 52. Waller has often been featured in other media based on DC Comics, with voice actresses CCH Pounder, Sheryl Lee Ralph, and Tisha Campbell voicing the character in cartoons and animated films such as Justice League Unlimited, Young Justice, the DC Animated Movie Universe, and Harley Quinn, as well as being portrayed in live action by Pam Grier in Smallville, Cynthia Addai-Robinson in the Arrowverse, and Angela Bassett in the film Green Lantern.

Casting in the DCEU

Actress Viola Davis was cast to play Waller in Suicide Squad, which is set in the DC Extended Universe. Davis stated of her character: "She's a strategist. She’s a manipulator. She doesn’t fly in the sky or swim in the water. She's just a regular person who can manipulate these superheroes. And I love that." She also singled out her psychology and strength and described her as a "powerful black woman, hard, ready to pick up a gun and shoot anyone at will," in addition to "relentless in her villainy" and noted that her powers are "her intelligence and her complete lack of guilt."

Davis read Confessions of a Sociopath in order to prepare for the role. She stated that her experience working on the film was unique for her, as director David Ayer and other cast members utilized unorthodox acting techniques during filming. In one instance, Ayer made her call Rick Flag actor Joel Kinnaman a "pussy" and "bitch", which as she described, made her "feel like a straight up thug, and it made Rick Flagg want to kick my ass. So David got what he wanted." Kinnaman later confirmed he felt "betrayed" by Davis' words, but that it was what Ayer wanted his character to feel at that moment. In a later interview, she said that during the early stages of filming, Joker actor Jared Leto had a "henchman" leave a dead pig on a table in the rehearsal room, unsettling Davis until she "snapped out of it" and used the incident to motivate her own performance, and that Leto had also given Margot Robbie, who portrayed Harley Quinn, a live black rat in a box. Davis commented that Robbie "screamed, and then she kept it."

Davis reprised the role in The Suicide Squad, Peacemaker, and Black Adam. She has also entered talks to star in an HBO Max series centered on her character.

Fictional character biography

DC Extended Universe

Creating Task Force X

Amanda Waller is introduced in Suicide Squad as an FBI official in charge of A.R.G.U.S.. She is shown to be in contact with vigilantes such as Bruce Wayne / Batman, to whom she provides intelligence in order for him to apprehend criminals such as Floyd Lawton / Deadshot. Following the death of Superman, Waller, concerned that the "next Superman" may not "share his moral code," creates Task Force X, later known as the "Suicide Squad", by enlisting incarcerated metahumans and other extraordinary criminals such as Deadshot, Harley Quinn, Captain Boomerang, El Diablo, and Killer Croc. She also attempts to enlist June Moon / Enchantress and Slipknot, but Enchantress goes rogue and creates a global threat while Slipknot is executed for desertion by squad leader Rick Flag during the squad's mission to contain Enchantress. The squad is forced to rescue Waller, much to their chagrin, as she is attempting to cover up her role in Enchantress' escape. 

After the team neutralizes Enchantress, freeing Moon from her possession, Waller rewards most of its members except Captain Boomerang with 10 years reduced from their sentences and various gifts. She later meets in-person with Bruce Wayne, giving him classified government documents on several metahumans including Arthur Curry and Barry Allen so he can recruit them for his own team, in exchange for Wayne protecting her reputation and concealing her involvement with Task Force X.

Destroying Project Starfish

Waller deploys two Task Force X groups in Corto Maltese following a coup to disrupt the country’s "Project Starfish", revealed to be a mission to conceal America’s role in the project. The first squad, led by Flag and also including Harley Quinn, Captain Boomerang, and several others, attacks via amphibious warfare and save for Flag, Quinn, T.D.K., and Weasel, is annihilated by Corto Maltese defenses, with Quinn being captured and T.D.K. and Weasel being left for dead but still had survived. Waller personally executes Savant for desertion by remotely detonating an explosive planted in his head. The second squad, consisting of Robert DuBois / Bloodsport, whom Waller personally blackmails into joining by threatening to incarcerate his daughter Tyla, Chris Smith / Peacemaker, Cleo Cazo / Ratcatcher 2, and Abner Krill / Polka-Dot Man, infiltrates while the Corto Maltese military is distracted by the first squad.

As the second squad rescues Flag and Quinn before converging on the location of Project Starfish, it is revealed by Thinker, who had been hired by Corto Maltese to oversee the project, that Waller had assembled this squad not only to destroy it, but to scrub any evidence of American involvement in the project, and that Peacemaker was specifically planted to ensure no one leaked this secret. The ensuing scuffle results in Peacemaker killing Flag and almost killing Cazo before Bloodsport subdues him, in addition to Starro, the giant, starfish-like alien at the center of "Project Starfish", breaking out and wreaking havoc on the island. Waller orders the remaining squad members to evacuate, but they defy her orders out of concern for Corto Maltese's citizens. Enraged, Waller threatens to execute them all before her subordinate Flo Crawley knocks her out and, along with Emilia Harcourt and John Economos, give the squad the go-ahead to save Corto Maltese from Starro. After they kill the giant alien, Bloodsport is able to negotiate with Waller to let the squad go free along to still drop his daughter's incarcerate, using the evidence he took of American involvement in Project Starfish as a bargaining chip.

Project Butterfly

Several months after Project Starfish, Waller commissions a new team to contain an extraterrestrial threat, with Clemson Murn assigned to lead and Peacemaker assigned after his recovery. As punishment for their insubordination during Project Starfish, Economos and Harcourt are also assigned by Waller, much to their chagrin as they feel as if they are being forced to "babysit" Smith in order to cover up, from the public, the existence of the Butterflies, parasitic aliens, who, after they had refuged to Earth after they kill their home planet, uses their own ability to take humans as hosts, killing their victims in the process, which they plan to help humanity from its attempts to profit off of its resources, like they did to their planet, by shifting their goals towards assimilating it (which, without Waller's knowledge, Murn was controlled by a Butterfly called Ik Nobe Lok who had remorsefully killed him in order to stop his own species's plan). Waller's daughter Leota Adebayo, also assigned to the team, is conflicted between following her mother's orders to incriminate Smith, with a diary, by Waller, which falsely details that the Butterflies aren’t real and that they only were imagined by Smith's delusions about world peace, and her bond with him. After Ik Nobe Lok was killed by his own species for betraying them and Harcourt assigns herself to the lead the team, Leota asks her mother for aid when Smith's team finds the "cow" of the Butterflies, a giant alien larva who give them a amber-like fluid they only feed on, after which Waller summons the Justice League, albeit too late but the team had still killed the "cow" which will starves to death the remaining Butterflies in the world. Leota, becoming disillusioned with her mother, later leaks Waller's involvement with both Project Butterfly and Task Force X, clearing Smith's name and putting a shocking Waller in a predicament in the process.

Release of Teth-Adam

After Teth-Adam is awakened from a 5,000-year slumber in Kahndaq, Waller contacts Carter Hall / Hawkman and the Justice Society, dispatching them to contain Adam and prevent him from potentially unleashing another rampage for which he was imprisoned by the Council of Wizards. After coming to terms with Adam and facing off against Intergang, the Justice Society take in Adam, who surrenders out of remorse and feeling unfit to be a hero. However, Adam is broken out of his containment by Kent Nelson / Doctor Fate and helps save the country from Sabbac. Waller contacts Adam, who has now adapted the more modern name Black Adam, warning him not to leave Khandaq and sending a since-resurrected Superman to have a word with him.

DC Universe

Forming the Creature Commandoes
In the continuity set after the events of The Flash, this intergation of Waller assembles a black ops team of monsters consisting of Rick Flag Sr., Nina Mazursky, Doctor Phosphorus, Eric Frankenstein, the Bride of Frankenstein, G.I. Robot, and Weasel.

Reception
Mark Birrel of Screen Rant ranked Amanda Waller in Suicide Squad the best villain in any DCEU film, looking at the films up to 2019. He writes "Viola Davis' turn as the fan-favorite character produced the DCEU's most human, and most cunning, villain in what has been their most critically reviled effort yet. Davis manages to outshine some of the biggest, brightest, loudest stars in an almighty ensemble movie that's chock-full of conflicting motivations and personalities." He also notes that her unwavering confidence and ruthlessness makes her the perfect "don" of the Suicide Squad. Darren Mooney writes in a review of the film's sequel The Suicide Squad that Waller's character and "spymaster archetype" had been deconstructed in the film, due to factors such as having a less dominating presence in the sequel in favor of the second Suicide Squad's members and being more mistake-prone, making errors such as erroneously sending Weasel on an amphibious assault when he is unable to swim and being out-maneuvered by Bloodsport in the film's climax. Mooney also describes Waller as the DCEU's counterpart to Nick Fury of the Marvel Cinematic Universe, continuing to say that like Fury, Waller is "another seemingly mortal character manipulating the superheroes around her within a military framework."

After the release of the film The Woman King, which starred Viola Davis, Renaldo Matadeen of CBR.com wrote in 2022 that the DCEU was "wasting" her portrayal of Amanda Waller, given Davis' strong performance in the film. Matadeen argued that the DCEU should have portrayed more angles of Waller's character instead of having her "being put in a box in the Suicide Squad and Peacemaker properties,  where she barks orders from the Task Force X headquarters", also calling her nothing more than a "corporate shill for the government" aside from when she met Bruce Wayne and came off as "quite scary" in Suicide Squad.

See also
Characters of the DC Extended Universe

Notes

References

 The plot description and characterization were adapted from Amanda Waller at the DC Extended Universe Wiki, which is available under a Creative Commons Attribution-Share Alike 3.0 (Unported) (CC-BY-SA 3.0) license.

External links

Black characters in films
DC Comics female supervillains
DC Extended Universe characters
Female characters in film
Fictional Federal Bureau of Investigation personnel
Fictional government agents
Fictional murderers
Fictional spymasters
Film characters introduced in 2016
Suicide Squad (film series)
Film supervillains
Female film villains